The Shamrock Club of Wisconsin is the oldest and largest Irish American membership organization in the State of Wisconsin. It was founded on March 17, 1960, in Milwaukee. Currently there are chapters in Milwaukee, Fox Cities (Appleton and Oshkosh),   Green Bay and Northeast Wisconsin      (Green Bay, Wisconsin),  South Central     (Baraboo), Dane County, (Madison), New London, La Crosse, and Lafayette County, (Darlington). The Rock County (Beloit and Janesville)  chapter folded in 2007.

The Shamrock Club was organized by members of Milwaukee's Irish community who had been a part of the Milwaukee Holiday Folk Fair's annual November festival. Helped by the International Institute of Wisconsin, the Club met to organize on March 17, 1960, St Patrick's Day. A few years later, it would incorporate under Wisconsin corporation laws, and later would receive a federal 501 C (4) as a charitable, social and cultural organization.

The Shamrock Club would gain a foothold in the Irish community by sponsoring and chartering flights to Ireland. These trips were very popular, and there were often multiple trips to Ireland each year. When the chartered flights program started, there was little in the way of direct flights to Ireland, and those that existed were often prohibitively expensive. Changes in the federal laws would take the Shamrock Club out of the charter business, as more commercial airlines saw the growing interest in Ireland to be a viable money making option for them.

State chapters

As interest in the Irish in Wisconsin grew, various chapters came to life across Wisconsin. The current chapters include  the Shamrock Club of La Crosse, in Western Wisconsin; Darlington's  LaFayette County chapter; New London's  Shamrock Club of New Dublin; Dane County,   based in Madison; The Shamrock Club of Green Bay and NE Wisconsin    , in Green Bay;  and the South Central Chapter, based in Baraboo and Portage. Fox Cities was revitalized by an influx of native born Irish in the late 2000s.  Some chapters have disappeared, including Twin Lakes, and Fond du Lac. The Rock County chapter disbanded in 2007, due to lack of new members.

Statewide chapters hold monthly meetings, organize Saint Patrick's Day parades, hold various festivities, raise the flag over the State Capitol, as well as other Irish related activities. In New London club leprechauns change the towns name to New Dublin for St. Patrick's Day week. All of the chapters are involved in fund-raising and have donated thousands of dollars to numerous causes in the past four decades. Membership includes the printed version of the monthly publication.

Milwaukee Chapter of the Shamrock Club of Wisconsin

The Milwaukee Chapter meets the first Thursday of each month at the Irish Cultural and Heritage Center, 2133 West Wisconsin Avenue.

Milwaukee Saint Patrick's Day activities throughout the year include:

Gaelic Mass at St. Patrick's Parish, 7th and Washington on Parade Day
Parade at Noon, Wisconsin Avenue.
Post Parade party, 1 p.m. at the ICHC.
Monthly meeting, 1st Thursdays of the month, 6.30 p.m., ICHC
Visit the Shamrock Club at Milwaukee Irish Fest in the Sales and Cultural Areas
Representing the Irish at Milwaukee's Holiday Folk Fair in the Cultural, Food, and Retail areas
The annual picnic in August.
The Halfway to St. Patrick's Day Mass and Breakfast in September.
Christmas Party and Pot Luck Dinner.
 Emerald Reflections, the monthly newsletter
Shamrock Club Color Guard Pipes and Drums
Easter Rising Mass

Milwaukee board of directors
The 2022-23 board of directors for the Milwaukee chapter are as follows: Josh Walton, Past President;  Brian Witt,  President; John Avery, Parliamentarian; Lisa Rott, treasurer; Sandra Chamorro,  membership;  Deb Kreuser, sergeant at arms; Kathy Avery, secretary; Megan Walton Mueller, Vice President;  Adam Bartlett,  Trustee; Pat Farley, Senior T Trustee; Michael Malloy, junior Trustee.  . Their terms are from July 5 1, 2022 until June 30, 2023.

They can be contacted at info@shamrockclubwis.com

Shamrock Club Color Guard Pipes and Drums

The Shamrock Club Color Guard Pipes and Drums of the Milwaukee chapter carry the colors of the Shamrock Club, Ireland, and various Irish organizations of Wisconsin. They have marched in Dublin, Ireland, San Antonio, Texas, Savannah, Georgia, New Orleans, Louisiana, and New York City. The combination of the Color Guard with the fully augmented pipe band has brought awards and praise to the unit.

Currently, the Color Guard is in a reorganization. t.

Organizations that grew from the Shamrock Club of Wisconsin

Organizations that grew directly or indirectly from the Shamrock Club are Milwaukee Irish Fest, founded in 1981 by Ed Ward, past president of the Shamrock Club; Cashel Dennehy  and Trinity Irish Dancers,   formed when the Shamrock Club gave up control of the Shamrock Club Dancers; the Irish Cultural and Heritage Center of Wisconsin,  founded by Shamrock Club members as a home for Milwaukee's Irish; and Celtic Women International, and the Conference of Celtic Women,  both founded by Jean Bills, who was treasurer of the Shamrock Club at the time.

Other organizations that have been given sponsorship or financial assistance by the Shamrock Club include: 
 Milwaukee School of Piping; the annual Irish Language immersion weekend in Milwaukee each year; Milwaukee Celtic Soccer Club; Milwaukee Hurling Club Shamrock Club Griffins and a youth team; and the Miltown Gaels Gaelic Football team.

Shamrock Club Scholarships 

Starting in 1972, the Shamrock Club came up with a scholarship for Irish Studies. Initially it was for students at the University of Wisconsin-Milwaukee. In the early 1970s, the Shamrock Club began fundraising for scholarship funds. This included an Irish film series at the University of Wisconsin Milwaukee Union's Cinema. The funds went to the Shamrock Club Scholarship Fund at the UW Milwaukee Foundation. Individuals in Irish or Irish-related fields of studies were given the scholarship to study in Ireland. Most of the Scholarship Winners came back to the Shamrock Club.

A total of fifteen scholarships were awarded between 1972 and 1996.  Scholarship funds were initially $500, but were increased to $1000 in the middle of the 1980s. Unfortunately, the funds were blended into the general UWM Foundation funds, and the scholarship money ran out in 1996. A change in how scholarship money was allocated led to the end of a self-perpetuating fund in 1994.

In 2003, the Scholarship Fund was resurrected by the Shamrock Club, this time managed by the Club itself. The scholarship was set at $500, but the parameters were changed to allow up to five winners per year, from all schools and universities in Wisconsin, or for Wisconsin residents of college age. Since 2003, 48 scholarships were awarded to students across the State of Wisconsin.

The Shamrock Club also administered the Milwaukee Chapter of the Ancient Order of Hibernians scholarship for a number of years.

The Shamrock Club also awarded the Ted Nestor Drumming and Piping Scholarship to Club members only for the Milwaukee School of Piping, until the school's demise. A total of 15 scholarships were award at $500 each.

Starting in 2021, the Shamrock Club will award $250 scholarships to one dancer in each of the Milwaukee area Irish dance schools. 

Through the end of calendar year 2022, the Shamrock Club has awarded over $40,000 in scholarships in all areas of interest.    Many students have used the money to study in Glencolmcille, County Donegal. Others have attended school at Trinity College, or many of the UC Colleges or the NUI schools in Ireland. Scholarships in the past have been awarded to students who went to the Craobh Curtin Conrad Na Gaeilge Language Immersion School, held each year in Milwaukee.

Chapter parades and festivals

Milwaukee St Patrick's Day Parade

The Shamrock Club would hold its first St Patrick's Parade in 1967 along Wisconsin Avenue. The parade was under the auspices of bar and restaurant owner Danny O'Donoghue for many years. O'Donoghue, a native of County Cork, was one of the driving forces of the Irish community in Milwaukee and Wisconsin for decades. The parade continued on Wisconsin Avenue until the Wisconsin Avenue's Bridge 1975 rebuilding forced a move to Mitchell Street, on Milwaukee's South Side. The parade was then headed up by Jeanne McCue, in 1976, and then Catherine "Cate" Harris in 1977. She was succeeded by Chuck Ward.  The North Avenue Business Association wooed it to North Avenue, where it ran from 53 to 74 Streets,  in 1986. Michael Boyle headed up the parade for many years, until he passed the reins to Tim O'Brien and Mick McDermott. The parade crossed two cities, Milwaukee and Wauwatosa.

The parade would later move to Bluemound Road for one year, in 2001, still crossing both the cities of Milwaukee and Wauwatosa. A move to Downtown Milwaukee took place in 2002, which was the beginning of a partnership with the Westown Association, a downtown business association promoting the neighborhood west of the Milwaukee River.  The Westown Association brought on Miller Lite in 2003 as presenting sponsor of the parade. During its run in downtown Milwaukee, the Shamrock Club has had Dan Malloy, Mike O'Leary and Kristine Pluskota all as parade directors. Mike Boyle returned in 2009, assisted by daughters Erin Boyle and Meghan Boyle. In 2012 and 2013, the parade was directed by Mike Boyle and Denis Donohoe. Killian's Irish Red, a MillerCoors brand, was the lead sponsor in 2013 and 2014.

In 2014, Josh Walton took over the parade. The parade was again led by Michael Boyle starting in 2015 and to the present.

The Shamrock Club of Wisconsin's parade annually draws between 40,000 and 80,000 spectators, who brave all types of weather conditions to watch the parade in either perfect or less than perfect conditions. It is the largest St. Patrick's celebration in the state of Wisconsin. The parade typically features between 120-150 units which include the area's six Irish dance schools, numerous pipe and drum corps, as well as other community leaders and Irish groups. In 2007, the New York City Police Department debuted in the Milwaukee St. Patrick's Day Parade, bringing a contingent of 95 officers to march. They returned in 2008, with over 100 of NYPD's finest helping Milwaukee celebrate, as well as many members of the New York City Fire Department.22

The 2019 Parade was  the 53rd annual, and was  held on Saturday, March 9, 2019. MillerCoors will be the presenting sponsor in 2018.
In 2020, the 543th Annual Saint Patrick's Parade was canceled, due to the Covid-19 pandemic. The Parade was due to be held on March 14, but on March 13, the City of Milwaukee, Shamrock Club and Westown jointly announced the cancellation of the parade, and other events held in conjunction with the parade. The parade was delayed in 2021 until September, but with the rise of the Delta Variant, it was again postponed until March 12, 2022. In 2023, the Parade will be held on March 11, starting again at Noon.  This will be the 55th edition of the parade. 

There is an annual Mass in Honor of St. Patrick Mass on Parade Day at the historic St Patrick's Church, 7 and Washington. Now mainly a Hispanic parish, it is decorated in Celtic knots and has a statue in honor of St Patrick and its heritage as an Irish immigrant church. The combination of pipes, choir and Gaelic liturgy have made it one of the highlights of the Irish community each St Patrick's Day.

A Post Parade Party has been held at various locations for the past fifty-four years. The most recent home has been the  Irish Cultural and Heritage Center, 2133 West Wisconsin Avenue, which is also the home of the Shamrock Club. The event is the largest Parade day family event in Milwaukee, with three Irish dance schools, a Scottish dance school, a dedicated children's education and play area, and a total of four stages. It averages about 1200 attendees each year.

New London - St. Patrick's Day Parade & Irish Fest

Each year the Shamrock Club of New Dublin hosts Wisconsin's largest St. Patrick's Day parade with an Irish Fest in New London. The parade typically features multiple bagpipe & marching bands, clown performers, specialty, clan, and business floats. Irish Fest is held in a heated big top tent with several Celtic style bands, food, beverage, and market booths.

A whole week of St. Patrick's Day events starts when club leprechauns rename the town to New Dublin. The events include; an evening of Irish entertainment, an Irish Ceili with a band and caller/teacher, Irish caroling, and an Irish wake parody. Corned beef and cabbage is served in the area in restaurants that week too. The parade and Irish Fest top off the week on Saturday.

Finnegan's Wake is a yearly tradition in 'New Dublin'. It started years ago as a 'lark' when locals in mourning paraded down the main street with a mannequin (Finnegan) in a wicker casket. The parade has grown each year since with Finnegan now riding in a green hearse with faulty door locks that allow him with casket to fly out when the hearse pulls away.

La Crosse - St Patrick Day Parade 
The La Crosse chapter has a St Patrick Day Parade on the Saturday prior to March 17 each year, in downtown La Crosse.

In addition, the La Crosse Chapter also has a number of activities during the week before St Patrick's Day, including caroling at nursing homes.

Green Bay St. Patrick Day Parade 
The Shamrock Club of Green Bay and Northeastern Wisconsin has a parade in downtown Green Bay on the Saturday prior to St. Patrick's Day.

Beloit St. Patricks Day Parade

The Rock County Chapter of the Shamrock Club is no longer in existence. The Shamrock club does not have a connection to the Beloit St. Patrick's Day parade any longer. The Beloit St. Patricks Day Parade took place every year in downtown Beloit. The parade began at the Kerry Group headquarters, a prominent food producer having originated in Ireland, and finished in Beloit's Central Park (Horace White). The parade was held annually on the Friday before St. Patricks Day.

Notes

References
Parade-goers are green and Gabby Milwaukee Journal Sentinel, by BRUCE MURPHY March 16, 2003
Shamrock Club and Bluemound Group Split Story Hill News January 18, 2004
Jackie Loohauis - Dancing, drumming for warmth. Last Updated: Feb. 28, 2001 JS online
Jeff Sherman - NYPD marches in Milwaukee parade. OnMilwaukee.com Last Updated:March 3, 2007
Jim Stingl - In my story closet, nothing is left hanging; February 21, 2009
Kathy Arenz -Irish eyes smile at celebration - March 23, 1997
Downtown Milwaukee St. Patrick's Day Parade March 13, 2010 - Post-Parade Celebrations Also Planned WISN 12 - March 2, 2010
Images: 2010 St. Patrick's Parade In Milwaukee WISN 12 - March 14, 2010
Milwaukee St. Patrick's Day Guide WTMJ Radio 620 - March 11, 2010

External links
Shamrock Club of Wisconsin (includes Milwaukee)
Shamrock Club of New Dublin (New London)
Dane County Shamrock Club
Greater La Crosse Area Shamrock Club
Shamrock Club of Lafayette County
Shamrock Club's Color Guard Website
Milwaukee St Patrick's Day Parade
Milwaukee Post Parade Party
Westown Organization
A Look at Irish Fest Volunteer Brian Witt
Irish Center May Lose Home
Shamrock Club Postpones 2021 Parade
Milwaukee St Patrick Day Parade 2023 Returns on March 11
St. Patrick's Day Parade sets date for 2023 

Irish-American organizations
Irish-American culture in Wisconsin
Wisconsin culture
1960 establishments in Wisconsin
Organizations established in 1960